The Law of the Land (or Law of the Land) is a 1917 silent film starring stage actress turned screen vamp Olga Petrova. The film was directed by Maurice Tourneur and produced by Jesse Lasky.

The story is based on the 1914 play The Law of the Land by George Broadhurst and starred Julia Dean in Petrova's role. Some scenes of this film were shot in Florida. This film is now lost.

Plot
As described in a film magazine, Margaret Harding (Petrova) becomes the wife of Richard Harding (Standing) to save her mother from ruin. The only happiness in her life is her young son, and one night when Harding threatens to whip the boy to death Margaret shoots him. Geoffrey Morton (Hamilton), who loves Margaret, and Margaret are charged with the crime. However, when Margaret explains to the police inspector (Hatch) the true state of affairs, and when her son shows marks where his father had hit him, Margaret and Geoffrey are exonerated and reunited.

Cast
Olga Petrova - Margaret Harding
Wyndham Standing - Richard Harding
Mahlon Hamilton - Geoffrey Morton
J.D. Haragan - Brockland
Robert Vivian - Chetwood
Riley Hatch - Inspector Cochrane (billed as William Riley Hatch)
William Conklin -

References

External links

synopsis at AllMovie

1917 films
American silent feature films
Films directed by Maurice Tourneur
American films based on plays
Lost American films
1917 drama films
Silent American drama films
American black-and-white films
1917 lost films
Lost drama films
1910s American films